The 1992 du Maurier Classic was contested from August 13–16 at St. Charles Country Club. It was the 20th edition of the du Maurier Classic, and the 14th edition as a major championship on the LPGA Tour.

This event was won by Sherri Steinhauer.

Final leaderboard

External links
 Golf Observer source

Canadian Women's Open
Sports competitions in Winnipeg
du Maurier Classic
du Maurier Classic
du Maurier Classic